Jamiul Futuh is a mosque in Markaz Knowledge City, Kozhikode district, Kerala state, India under the Markaz by Sheikh Abubakr Ahmad.  It was proposed along with Knowledge City on 12 acre land and is said to accommodate about 25000 people at an estimated cost of about 400 million.

It  is said to be based on the Mughal architectural style.and follow the green building concept . Besides the vast prayer hall, the complex would have an auditorium for conducting seminars, a huge library and facilities for accommodating over 1000 people at a time. The building would cover eight acres and would be surrounded by a four-acre green belt and garden.

It will contain a relic believed by Muslims to be a hair of the Islamic prophet Muhammad. The name of the Masjid comes from the Arabic word shahre, meaning hair, and mubarak, meaning blessed.

See also
Sheikh Abubakr Ahmad
 Knowledge City
 Markaz Arts and Science College
 Markaz Law College
Markazu Saquafathi Sunniyya
Markaz, Dubai

References

Sufi shrines in India
Mosques in Kerala
Markaz
Religious buildings and structures in Kozhikode district
Shahre Mubarak